WXPI is an independent, non-commercial, listener-supported community radio station in Jersey Shore, Pennsylvania, United States broadcasting at 88.5 MHz FM. The station, which serves part of the greater Williamsport area in Lycoming County, airs a mix of news, public affairs, and music programming.

Licensed by the FCC in 2011, WXPI is affiliated with the Pacifica Radio network, while its local programming is staffed entirely by volunteers. The station is owned by Williamsport Independent Media, Inc., which publishes the Williamsport Guardian, the region's alternative newspaper.

References

External links
 

Community radio stations in the United States
XPI
Radio stations established in 2011